Imtiaz Safdar Waraich (born November 15, 1952), is a Pakistani politician affiliated with Pakistan Peoples Party . Previously he was a member of Pakistan Tehreek-e-Insaf.

He has travelled to Norway, U.A.E and India. His hobbies include reading and walking. He is married and has one daughter and one son.

Political career
During his political career, Imtiaz Safdar Waraich has held office as General Secretary of District Bar 111 Association from 1982 to 1983, Member of Zila Council from 1983 to 1991, Member of the Punjab Provincial Assembly 1993–1996, Parliamentary Secretary of Law from 1994 to 1996, Advisor to the Chief Minister Punjab in 1996 and Director of the Punjab Provincial Cooperative Bank Ltd.

Areas of legislative interest
Law
Membership of National Assembly Committees
Standing Committee on Public Accounts
Standing Committee on Law, Justice & Human Rights.

Educational background
He is a lawyer by profession. He completed M.A in political science after obtaining an LLB and has been a member of the Bar Association of Gujranwala since 1975.

References 

Living people
Punjab MPAs 1993–1996
Pakistan People's Party politicians
People from Gujranwala
Punjabi people
Year of birth missing (living people)